Cinere–Jagorawi Toll Road or Cijago Toll Road is a  toll road which extends from Cimanggis to Cinere in West Java, Indonesia. This toll road is part of the Jakarta Outer Ring Road 2. The toll road is connected to Jagorawi Toll Road, Depok-Antasari Toll Road and Cinere-Serpong Toll Road. The toll road is expected to be completed by the end of 2018. Metro and long distance and long or medium distances from Depok can use this toll road, without passing Lenteng Agung and Pasar Minggu.

Sections
The toll road is divided into three sections. Section 1 and I is operational while section III is under construction.
Section 1: extends from Jagorawi to Raya Bogor (operational) 
Section 2: from Raya Bogor to Kukusan (operational),
Section 3 from Kukusan to Cinere (under construction).

Toll gate

See also

Trans-Java toll road

References

Buildings and structures in Jakarta
Toll roads in Indonesia
Transport in Jakarta
Transport in West Java